The Ordosian culture, sometimes referred to as the Ordos culture, is a culture documented in the Ordos Plateau, in the south of the Inner Mongolian Autonomous Region of the People's Republic of China, from the Upper Palaeolithic. 

The points and sides of their tools indicate a "Moustero-Levalloisian" element. They seemed to have a masterful knowledge of Upper Palaeolithic technology, producing blades as much as fifteen centimeters long.

References

Citations

Sources
Kozłowski, J. K., "The problem of the so-called Ordos culture in the light of the Palaeolithic finds from northern China and southern Mongolia", 1982, Folia Quaternaria 39: 63-99 

Archaeology of Inner Mongolia
Archaeological cultures of Central Asia
Paleolithic cultures of Asia
Archaeological cultures of China
Paleolithic China